Jerome A. "Jerry" Nachman (February 24, 1946 – January 19, 2004) was the editor-in-chief and vice president of MSNBC cable news network., and former editor of the New York Post.

Early years
Nachman was born in Red Hook, Brooklyn and raised in Pittsburgh, Pennsylvania. Nachman's parents got a divorce when he was a child so he moved in with his mother and stepfather in Pittsburgh. Nachman attended, but did not graduate from, Youngstown State University for seven years, not taking a single journalism class. He then worked a number of newspaper jobs before moving into broadcasting.

Biography
Nachman was editor-in-chief of the New York Post from 1989 to 1992, following a stint as a police reporter and political commentator at the Post. Prior to that, he served as news director of New York's NBC station, WNBC-TV, and as Vice President of New York's CBS flagship station, WCBS-TV. He served as the general manager of WRC radio and local television stations in Washington, D.C. Nachman also wrote scripts for television programs and produced the late-night, half-hour political talk show Politically Incorrect hosted by Bill Maher during the 2000 elections.

Family
Nachman was married to Nancy Cook, but the marriage ended in divorce. His brother's name is Larry and he lived in Staten Island.

Awards and honors
Nachman was a Peabody Award, Edward R. Murrow Award, and Emmy Award winner and twice served as a Pulitzer Prize juror.

Death
Nachman died of cancer in 2004 at his home in Hoboken, New Jersey at the age of 57.

References

1946 births
2004 deaths
Emmy Award winners
MSNBC people
New York Post people
Peabody Award winners
People from Red Hook, Brooklyn
Writers from Pittsburgh
Deaths from cancer in New Jersey
Journalists from Pennsylvania
20th-century American journalists
American male journalists